The Hodag Country Festival, founded in 1978,  is an outdoor music festival held each summer in Rhinelander, in Oneida County, Wisconsin, United States. When the first festival was held August 4–6, 1978, it featured Freddy Fender and Jana Jae and had an attendance of about 500. It is named for the folkloric Hodag, first reported to exist in 1893 in Rhinelander.

The "Hodag" was founded by Bernie and Diane Eckert, Ernie Feight, and Ted Tschannen. Tschannen left after about two years, while Feight was part of the festival until 1994, when he sold his shares to the four Eckert children and the festival became an Eckert family business. After Bernie and Diane Eckert's deaths in 2002 and 2008, their children have operated the festival.

Hodag is usually held the second weekend in July. The festival has an estimated attendance of 30,000-50,000 each year. The Hodag Country Festival Campgrounds will often have space available for 9 day ticket holders. 9 day tickets, 2 day tickets and 1 day tickets can be purchased by phone, online, and at established ticket outlets in Wisconsin and the Upper Peninsula of Michigan.

In conjunction with the Hodag Country Festival, country music radio stations around the state of Wisconsin and the Upper Peninsula of Michigan sponsor regional country band contests. The first-place winners of each region will then advance to the Hodag Country Festival to compete for the title of Wisconsin State Country Band Champion.

Popular country music stars have performed at the festival including Garth Brooks, Tim McGraw, Reba McEntire, Neal McCoy, Brooks and Dunn, Jake Owen, Kellie Pickler, Lee Brice, and Toby Keith.

There was no festival in 2020 as officials cited the COVID-19 pandemic as grounds for cancellation.

See also
List of country music festivals
Country music

References

External links

Folk festivals in the United States
Rock festivals in the United States
Music festivals established in 1978
Tourist attractions in Oneida County, Wisconsin
Festivals in Wisconsin
Country music festivals in the United States
Music festivals in Wisconsin
1978 establishments in Wisconsin